Oscillators produce various levels of phase noise, or variations from perfect periodicity. Viewed as an additive noise, phase noise increases at frequencies close to the oscillation frequency or its harmonics. With the additive noise being close to the oscillation frequency, it cannot be removed by filtering without  also removing the oscillation signal.

All well-designed nonlinear oscillators have stable limit cycles, meaning that if perturbed, the oscillator will naturally return to its periodic limit cycle. When perturbed, the oscillator responds by spiraling back into the limit cycle, but not necessarily at the same phase. This is because the oscillator is autonomous; it has no stable time reference. The phase is free to drift. As a result, any perturbation of the oscillator causes the phase to drift, which explains why the noise produced by an oscillator is predominantly in phase.

Oscillator voltage noise and phase-noise spectra

There are two different ways commonly used to characterize noise in an oscillator. Sφ is the spectral density of the phase and Sv is the spectral density of the voltage. Sv contains both amplitude and phase components, but with oscillators the phase noise dominates except at frequencies far from the carrier and its harmonics. Sv is directly observable on a spectrum analyzer, whereas Sφ is only observable if the signal is first passed through a phase detector. Another measure of oscillator noise is L, which is simply Sv normalized to the power in the fundamental.

As t → ∞ the phase of the oscillator drifts without bound, and so Sφ(Δf) → ∞ as Δf → 0. However, even as the phase drifts without bound, the excursion in the voltage is limited by the diameter of the limit cycle of the oscillator. Therefore, as Δf → 0 the PSD of v flattens out, as shown in Figure 3(removed due to unknown copyright status). The more phase noise, broader the linewidth (the
higher the corner frequency), and the lower signal amplitude within the linewidth. This happens because the phase noise does not affect the total power in the signal, it only affects its distribution. Without noise, Sv(f) is a series of impulse functions at the harmonics of the oscillation frequency. With noise, the impulse functions spread, becoming fatter and shorter but retaining the same total power.

The voltage noise Sv is considered to be a small signal outside the linewidth and thus can be accurately predicted using small-signal analyses. Conversely, the voltage noise within the linewidth is a large signal (it is large enough to cause the circuit to behave nonlinearly) and cannot be predicted with small-signal analyses. Thus, small-signal noise analysis, such as is available from RF simulators, is valid only up to the corner frequency (it does not model the corner itself).

Oscillators and frequency correlation
With driven cyclostationary systems that have a stable time reference, the correlation in
frequency is a series of impulse functions separated by fo = 1/T. Thus, noise at f1 is correlated
with f2 if f2 = f1 + kfo, where k is an integer, and not otherwise. However, the phase produced by oscillators that exhibit phase noise is not stable. And while the noise produced by oscillators is correlated across frequency, the correlation is not a set of equally spaced impulses as it is with driven systems. Instead, the correlation is a set of smeared impulses. That is, noise at f1 is correlated with f2 if f2 = f1 + kfo, where k is close to being an integer.

Technically, the noise produced by oscillators is not cyclostationary. This distinction only becomes significant when the output of an oscillator is compared to its own output from the distant past. This might occur, for example, in a radar system where the current output of an oscillator might be mixed with the previous output after it was delayed by traveling to and from a distant object. It occurs because the phase of the oscillator has drifted randomly during the time-of-flight. If the time-of-flight is long enough, the
phase difference between the two becomes completely randomized and the two signals can be treated as if they are non-synchronous. Thus, the noise in the return signal can be taken as being stationary because it is 'non-synchronous'
with the LO, even though the return signal and the LO are derived from the same oscillator. If the time-of-flight is very short, then there is no time for the phase difference between the two to become randomized and the noise is treated as if it is simply cyclostationary. Finally, if the time-of-flight significant but less than the time it takes the oscillator’s phase to become completely randomized, then the phase is only partially randomized. In this case, one must be careful to take into account the smearing in the correlation spectrum that occurs with oscillators.

References 

Oscillators
Noise (electronics)